DLF Cyber City is a corporate park in Gurugram, Haryana, India, which was opened in 2003. The area is home to several top IT and Fortune 500 company offices. The area has been termed a "futuristic commercial hub" and is considered one of the largest hubs of IT activity in Delhi NCR. Cyber City lies near Udyog Vihar, which is a conventional industrial area on the opposite side of NH-48. 

Cyber Hub is a large shopping and eating area with a number of leading  restaurants and shops, which caters primarily to the people working in DLF Cyber City.

Transport
In 2013, Rapid Metro was introduced to Cyber City, connecting it with Delhi Metro. Six operational stations are within the Cyber City. The National Highway 48 (NH-48) runs through Cyber City and a project to construct a 16-lane expressway is also in progress. A flyover between Cyber City and MG Road was opened in 2015 to reduce traffic congestion. The Indira Gandhi International Airport is located close to the Cyber City. Delhi Metro Phase 4 includes the extension of the Yellow Line from its current Southern terminus at Huda City Centre further south to Cyber City. This will ensure another option for people staying in the heart of Delhi at Rajiv Chowk to directly access this district ensuring better connectivity to the suburban business centres from Central Delhi.

Entertainment
Cyber City is surrounded by 26 shopping malls, seven golf courses and several luxury shops selling productions from international brands such as Chanel and Louis Vuitton. Cyber hub is situated in the cyber city and consists of various clothing brands like Marks and Spencer, Chumbak, UNIQLO and a large bookshop called "The crossword". Not only clothing and stationary but the cyber hub complex also consists of a KIA MOTORS Dealership.

Gateway Tower 
Gateway Tower is a tall building at the entrance of the Cyber City that houses of the headquarters of DLF (company). It is one of the most searched property in Gurgaon.

Cyber Green Building 
Cyber Green building is an official and commercial building located in Cyber City.

Cyber-Hub 
Cyber Hub is a massive courtyard within Cyber City and is considered as a hub of food and beverages in Gurgaon. There is an open-air amphitheater that plays host to weekend cultural & art shows and rock concerts. Cyber Hub being the favourite foodie destination for people living in the NCR region is surrounded by premium housing complexes near cyber hub also a golf course in close vicinity.

Gallery

See also
Electronic City in Bengaluru
HITEC City in Hyderabad
Hinjawadi in Pune
Genome Valley
Whitefield, Bangalore
New Town, Kolkata 
Bidhannagar, Kolkata

References

External links
Official Website of DLF Cyber City

Economy of Gurgaon
Economy of Haryana
Industrial parks in India
Business parks of India